Ljuban Crepulja (born 2 September 1993) is a Croatian professional footballer who plays as a midfielder for Liga I club Rapid București. In his career, Crepulja also played for teams such as HNK Segesta, Slaven Belupo, FK Sarajevo or Astra Giurgiu.

Club career

Youth career
Crepulja, though born in Čapljina, Bosnia and Herzegovina, hails from Sisak, where he went through the ranks of HNK Segesta, debuting as a 16-year-old in the Druga HNL. He was picked up by GNK Dinamo Zagreb's feeder team NK Lokomotiva the following season for their U19 team, progressing to Dinamo U19 team itself for the 2011–12 season.

Hrvatski Dragovoljac
Not given a professional contract by Dinamo, he moved to Druga HNL again, this time to NK Hrvatski Dragovoljac, where he established himself as a first-team regular and made his first youth international caps, playing for the Croatia U20 team in December 2012.

Slaven Belupo
Dragovoljac was promoted at the end of the season, but Crepulja moved to NK Slaven Belupo. Though his start at the club was marred by a drunk-driving incident, he remained a first team regular at the club.

On 19 January 2016, it was reported that Crepulja was in Glasgow for signing talks with Celtic.

Sarajevo
Crepulja signed for Premier League of Bosnia and Herzegovina club FK Sarajevo on 6 February 2018. He left Sarajevo after almost half a year on 17 June 2019.

Astra Giurgiu
On 28 June 2019, Crepulja signed a two-years contract with Romanian club Astra Giurgiu.

Honours

Player

Club
Hrvatski Dragovoljac
2. HNL: 2012–13
Shakhtyor Soligorsk
Belarusian Cup runner-up: 2016–17
Sarajevo
Bosnian Premier League: 2018–19
Bosnian Cup: 2018–19
Astra Giurgiu
Cupa României runner-up: 2020–21

References

External links

Ljuban Crepulja at Sportnet.hr 

1993 births
Living people
People from Čapljina
Croats of Bosnia and Herzegovina
Association football midfielders
Croatian footballers
Croatia youth international footballers
HNK Segesta players
NK Hrvatski Dragovoljac players
NK Slaven Belupo players
K.V. Mechelen players
FC Shakhtyor Soligorsk players
FK Sarajevo players
FC Astra Giurgiu players
FC Rapid București players
First Football League (Croatia) players
Croatian Football League players
Belgian Pro League players
Belarusian Premier League players
Premier League of Bosnia and Herzegovina players
Liga I players
Croatian expatriate footballers
Expatriate footballers in Belgium
Croatian expatriate sportspeople in Belgium
Expatriate footballers in Belarus
Croatian expatriate sportspeople in Belarus
Expatriate footballers in Romania
Croatian expatriate sportspeople in Romania